Carnedd Dafydd is a mountain peak in the Carneddau range in Snowdonia, Wales, and is the third highest peak in Wales, or the fourth if Crib y Ddysgl on the Snowdon ridge is counted.  Situated south-west of Carnedd Llewelyn and north of Pen yr Ole Wen, Carnedd Dafydd is on the main ridge of the Carneddau, and on the border between Gwynedd and Conwy.  The average annual temperature of the mountain is around 3–4 °C.

Carnedd Dafydd rises to height of 1,044 m (according to OS maps detail) and is usually climbed by first ascending Pen yr Ole Wen and then following the ridge along to Carnedd Dafydd, though it is also possible to make a direct ascent from Tal y Llyn Ogwen, first following the stream, Afon Lloer, to the mountain lake of Ffynnon Lloer then climbing up the slope to the summit.

Like most of the summits in the southern Carneddau, it has a flat, boulder-strewn summit plateau. Immediately to the north lie the crags of Ysgolion Duon, well known to climbers.

The origin of its name, which translates as Dafydd's (or David's) cairn, like that of its neighbouring peak, Carnedd Llewelyn (Llywelyn's cairn), are named after Llywelyn ap Gruffudd, the last independent prince of Wales, and his younger brother, Dafydd ap Gruffudd. The nearby peak Carnedd Lladron, commonly known as Carnedd Uchaf, has now been renamed by O.S. Carnedd Gwenllian in memory of Llywelyn's daughter Lady Gwenllian. Dafydd was captured at Nanhysglain, near Bera Mawr, on 21 June 1283; taken to Shrewsbury, he was hanged, drawn and quartered.

References

External links
www.geograph.co.uk : photos of Carnedd Dafydd

Hewitts of Wales
Mountains and hills of Snowdonia
Nuttalls
Mountains and hills of Conwy County Borough
Mountains and hills of Gwynedd
Furths
Llanllechid
Capel Curig
One-thousanders of Wales